The 1997–98 Croatian Football Cup was the seventh edition of Croatia's football knockout competition. Croatia Zagreb were the defending champions, and they won their third successive title.

Calendar

First round

Second round

Quarter-finals

|}

Semi-finals

First legs

Second legs

Croatia Zagreb won 7–0 on aggregate.

Varteks won 3–1 on aggregate.

Final

First leg

Second leg

Croatia Zagreb won 3–1 on aggregate.

See also
1997–98 Croatian First Football League

External links
Official website 
1997–98 in Croatian football at Rec.Sport.Soccer Statistics Foundation
Croatian Cup Finals at Rec.Sport.Soccer Statistics Foundation

Croatian Football Cup seasons
Croatian Cup, 1997-98
Croatian Cup, 1997-98